Solem v. Stumes, 465 U.S. 638 (1984), was a United States Supreme Court case in which the Court held that its decision in Edwards v. Arizona (1980) should not be applied retroactively.

External links
 

United States Supreme Court cases
United States Supreme Court cases of the Burger Court
1984 in United States case law